Our Pathetic Age is the sixth studio album by American music producer DJ Shadow, released through Mass Appeal Records on November 15, 2019. It features the singles "Rocket Fuel" (featuring De La Soul) and "Rosie". It also features collaborations with Run the Jewels, Ghostface Killah, Nas, and Raekwon, among others.

Background
DJ Shadow said that "despite the title, it's a hopeful, vibrant album", elaborating that "People are addicted to, and addled by, distraction; they're angry and confused, and disaffected by their own governmental institutions. There's songs that are inspired by this energy and seek to harness it, to make sense of it. In some cases, there's attempts to salve the wound; in others, the songs merely observe but don't offer solutions."

Composition
The album contains two sections: the first (tracks 1–11) contains instrumental tracks, while the second (tracks 12–26) features songs with guest vocalists.

Critical reception
On Metacritic, which assigns a weighted average score out of 100 to reviews from mainstream critics, the album received an average score of 69, based on 13 reviews, indicating "generally favorable reviews".

Thomas Hobbs of Pitchfork wrote, "Shadow deserves credit for spotlighting so many enigmatic underground characters, something he has done throughout his career, but the overabundance of ideas and conflicting styles quickly becomes jarring."

Track listing

Charts

References

2019 albums
DJ Shadow albums
Mass Appeal Records albums